Plantation is a census-designated place (CDP) in Sarasota County, Florida, United States.  The population was 4,919 at the 2010 census. It is part of the Bradenton–Sarasota–Venice Metropolitan Statistical Area.

Geography

Demographics

According to the 2020 U.S. census, there was a population of 4,919 and 2,596 households. 96.8% of the population was white, 0.8% black, .06% Asian, .1% Native Hawaiian or other Pacific Islander, 1.7% two or more races, and 2.9% Hispanic or Latino. The median household income was $71,413 with a per capita income in the past 12 months of $46,869. 

.4% of the population was under 5 years old, 4.9% under 18 years old, and 70.6% was 65 years or older. 55.6% of the population was female.

References

Census-designated places in Sarasota County, Florida
Sarasota metropolitan area
Census-designated places in Florida